Gurvan tes (Three tes) is a sum (district) of Ömnögovi Province in southern Mongolia. The Nariin Sukhait mining complex (Ovoot Tolgoi) is 25 km southeast of the sum center. In 2009, its population was 4,034.

References 

Districts of Ömnögovi Province